Statistics of Swedish football Division 3 for the 1967 season.

League standings

Norra Norrland, Övre 1967

Norra Norrland, Nedre 1967

Södra Norrland, Övre 1967

Södra Norrland, Nedre 1967

Norra Svealand 1967

Östra Svealand 1967

Västra Svealand 1967

Nordöstra Götaland 1967

Nordvästra Götaland 1967

Mellersta Götaland 1967

Sydöstra Götaland 1967

Sydvästra Götaland 1967

Skåne 1967

Footnotes

References 

Swedish Football Division 3 seasons
3
Swed
Swed